The Central Hawks Football Club is an Australian rules football club currently in recess. It had been in the Southern Football League (SFL), in Tasmania, Australia.

History
The Central Hawks were formed in 2005 following the merger of Bothwell, Oatlands and Kempton Football Clubs from the Oatlands District Football Association. They entered the Southern Football League in 2006.

In 2013 the Central Hawks were forced to go into recess because of a lack of player numbers. The Hawks first entered the SFL in 2006 as a combination of former ODFA clubs Oatlands, Bothwell and Kempton. But Bothwell has re-entered the ODFA for this year in its own right.   It will be a ten team competition with a final five format.

Records
Entry to Southern Football League
 2006

SFL premierships
 Nil.

SFL runner up
 Nil.

Finalists
2007, 2009, 2010

Results
Games - 130,  wins - 52, losses - 78

Club record games holder
 119 - Leigh Wilson - as at End 2012 Season

Club record score
 Central Hawks 33.24 (222) v Triabunna 2.3 (15) on Round 4 2008 at Bothwell Oval.

References

External links
 Official website (Archive, Sep 2007)

Australian rules football clubs in Tasmania
Australian rules football clubs established in 2005
2005 establishments in Australia